UPCA may refer to:
 Uttar Pradesh Cricket Association
Federal Republic of Central America, originally the United Provinces of Central America
University of the Philippines College of Agriculture
UPC-A, a specific format of a Universal Product Code
Unified Patent Court Agreement, an international treaty provisionally applicable since January 19, 2022, and establishing a common patent court in Europe